Catherine Ouellette (born 16 May 1996) is a Canadian professional racing cyclist who rides for Rally Cycling.

See also
 List of 2016 UCI Women's Teams and riders

References

External links
 

1996 births
Living people
Canadian female cyclists
Place of birth missing (living people)
20th-century Canadian women
21st-century Canadian women